The Buchanan County Courthouse is a historic courthouse building located at Grundy, Buchanan County, Virginia.  It was built in 1905–06. The Renaissance Revival style building is the only building in the downtown with pretensions to architectural sophistication. Designed by architect Frank Pierce Milburn, the design employs local stone, emphasized with a corner clock tower topped with a belvedere. A 1915 fire gutted most of the downtown, including the courthouse, which was rebuilt and expanded by 1917.

It was listed on the National Register of Historic Places in 1982.

References

Renaissance Revival architecture in Virginia
Government buildings completed in 1906
Buildings and structures in Buchanan County, Virginia
County courthouses in Virginia
Frank Pierce Milburn buildings
Clock towers in Virginia
Government buildings completed in 1917
Courthouses on the National Register of Historic Places in Virginia
National Register of Historic Places in Buchanan County, Virginia
1906 establishments in Virginia